Beyond Einstein may refer to:
Beyond Einstein (book), a popular physics book by Michio Kaku and Jennifer Trainer
Beyond Einstein program, a NASA space-exploration program